This will be the 27th edition of Kuwait Crown Prince Cup where the 15 teams are in a knockout stage.

Kuwait SC are the defending champions.

Bracket
Draw was held on 11 November 2019.

Note:     H: Home team,   A: Away team

Final

References

External links
Kuwaiti Crown Prince Cup 2019/2020, Goalzz.com
, int.soccerway.com

Kuwait Crown Prince Cup
Kuwait Crown Prince Cup
Crown Prince Cup